Chamberlain is a city in Brule County, South Dakota, United States. It is located on the west bank of the Missouri River, at the dammed section of the Lake Francis Case, close to where it is crossed by Interstate 90.

The population of Chamberlain was 2,473 at the 2020 census. It is the county seat of Brule County.

Chamberlain is home to the South Dakota Hall of Fame, and the 50-foot tall Dignity statue is nearby.

History
Chamberlain was named after Selah Chamberlain, a railroad director of the Chicago, Milwaukee and St. Paul Railway, as it was established by European Americans in relation to construction of the railroad. The city is called "earth dwelling" in Lakota.

Geography

Climate

Demographics

2010 census
As of the census of 2010, there were 2,386 people, 1,040 households, and 588 families living in the city. The racial makeup of the city was 81.9% White, 0.3% African American, 14.8% Native American, 0.2% Asian, 0.1% from other races, and 2.8% from two or more races. Hispanic or Latino of any race were 1.5% of the population.

There were 1,040 households, of which 28.3% had children under the age of 18 living with them, 41.9% were married couples living together, 12.9% had a female householder with no husband present, 2.7% had a male householder with no wife present, and 43.4% were non-families. 36.9% of all households were made up of individuals, and 15% had someone living alone who was 65 years of age or older. The average household size was 2.17 and the average family size was 2.87.

The median age in the city was 41.8 years. 24.1% of residents were under the age of 18; 6.9% were between the ages of 18 and 24; 22.7% were from 25 to 44; 28.7% were from 45 to 64; and 17.6% were 65 years of age or older. The gender makeup of the city was 45.7% male and 54.3% female.

2000 census
As of the census of 2000, there were 2,338 people, 942 households, and 550 families living in the city. The population density was 360.8 people per square mile (139.3/km2). There were 1,044 housing units at an average density of 161.1 per square mile (62.2/km2). The racial makeup of the city was 86.83% White, 0.60% African American, 10.18% Native American, 0.38% Asian, 0.04% Pacific Islander, 0.13% from other races, and 1.84% from two or more races. Hispanic or Latino of any race were 0.68% of the population.

There were 942 households, out of which 29.0% had children under the age of 18 living with them, 45.3% were married couples living together, 10.0% had a female householder with no husband present, and 41.6% were non-families. 36.2% of all households were made up of individuals, and 15.2% had someone living alone who was 65 years of age or older. The average household size was 2.27 and the average family size was 3.01.

In the city the population was spread out, with 26.9% under the age of 18, 6.8% from 18 to 24, 27.2% from 25 to 44, 21.5% from 45 to 64, and 17.5% who were 65 years of age or older. The median age was 38 years. For every 100 females, there were 86.0 males. For every 100 females age 18 and over, there were 82.6 males.

As of 2000 the median income for a household in the city was $34,487, and the median income for a family was $43,500. Males had a median income of $29,545 versus $22,009 for females. The per capita income for the city was $17,018. About 4.4% of families and 12.0% of the population were below the poverty line, including 3.9% of those under age 18 and 25.9% of those age 65 or over.

Economy

Chamberlain Manganese Deposits

Education
It is located in the Chamberlain School District.

Infrastructure

Transportation
Chamberlain is served by the Chamberlain Municipal Airport, as well as the following three highways:

See also
 List of cities in South Dakota

References

External links

 

 
Cities in Brule County, South Dakota
Cities in South Dakota
County seats in South Dakota
South Dakota populated places on the Missouri River
Populated places established in 1881
1881 establishments in the United States